An Empire biscuit (Imperial biscuit, Imperial cookie, double biscuit, German biscuit, Belgian biscuit, double shortbread, Empire cookie or biscuit bun) is a sweet biscuit eaten in Scotland, and other Commonwealth countries. It is popular in Northern Ireland, and it is an iconic cookie in Winnipeg as well as the greater Hamilton, ON region,
Canada.

History
Empire biscuit was originally known as the "Linzer biscuit", and later as the "Deutsch biscuit". With the outbreak of the First World War it was renamed in England to Empire biscuit and in Scotland to Belgian biscuit because Belgium had just been invaded, but in Northern Ireland it remains known as the German biscuit or biscuit bun. In Scotland the name now varies depending on the region, with the North-east typically calling it a double shortbread and the West an Empire biscuit. In Northern Ireland it is commonly found with a jam and coconut topping. It is also known as the "Belgian biscuit", due to being topped in a similar way to a Belgian bun, which is made of pastry or dough.
There also exists a biscuit similar to the Jammie Dodger which is referred to as a Linzer biscuit.

Ingredients
The typical Empire Biscuit has a layer of jam in between two biscuits, typically shortbread. The top is covered with white water icing, usually decorated with a glace cherry in the centre, but Dew Drops are common too. They are derived from the Austrian Linzer Augen, a similar shortbread cookie sandwich which has 1-3 small round cut outs (the "eyes") in the upper cookie and is dusted with powdered sugar. The empire biscuit does not have a cut-out section on the top and is decorated with white icing.

Similar products
Empire biscuits are similar to Viennese whirls.

New Zealand

Known as a "Belgium" or as a "Belgian biscuit" in New Zealand, this type of biscuit gained popularity towards the end of the Great War and is now typically found either in biscuit or slice form. Typically, spiced biscuits are filled with raspberry jam and topped with pink or white icing, with raspberry jelly crystals scattered on top instead of the cherry. These are quite different to the Empire biscuit, which bears more similarity to a NZ 'Shrewsbury'.

See also
 List of shortbread biscuits and cookies
Other foods renamed for political reasons include:
Liberty cabbage
Freedom fries

References

External links
 Review of biscuit on Nice Cup of Tea and a Sit Down

Biscuits
Scottish desserts
New Zealand desserts
Shortbread
Culture of Manitoba